Elias Franklin Drake (December 21, 1813 – February 14, 1892) was an American businessman and politician.

Biography
Drake was born in Urbana, Ohio. He worked with the bank in Xenia, Ohio and was admitted to the Ohio bar. Drake was also served in the Ohio militia and was commissioned a colonel. Drake was involved in the railroad business. Franklin served in the Ohio House of Representatives from 1844 to 1848 and was a member of the Whig Party. He also served as speaker of the Ohio House of Representatives. Later Drake was involved in the Republican Party. In 1864, Drake moved to Saint Paul, Minnesota where he continued to be involved in the railroad business. He served in the Minnesota Senate as a Republican in 1874 and 1875. He died at the Hotel del Coronado in San Diego, California after being in failing health.

Notes

External links

1813 births
1892 deaths
People from Urbana, Ohio
Politicians from Xenia, Ohio
Businesspeople from Ohio
Businesspeople from Saint Paul, Minnesota
Politicians from Saint Paul, Minnesota
Military personnel from Ohio
Ohio lawyers
Minnesota Republicans
Republican Party members of the Ohio House of Representatives
Ohio Whigs
Minnesota state senators
Speakers of the Ohio House of Representatives
19th-century American businesspeople
19th-century American lawyers